Mirza Muhammad Haidar Dughlat Beg (Persian: میرزا محمد حیدر دولت بیگ c. 1499/1500 – 1551) was a Chagatai Turco-Mongol military general, governor of Kashmir, and a historical writer, He was a Mughal Dughlat prince who wrote in Persian. Haidar and Babur were cousins on their mother's side, through the line of Genghis Khan. Unlike Babur, Haidar considered himself more of an ethnic Mongol of Mughalistan.

Background
Mirza Haider Dughlat in the Tarikh-i Rashidi constantly alludes to a distinct tribe or community of Moghuls in Mughalistan, however reduced in numbers, who had preserved Mongol customs, and from the incindental references to Mongolian phrases and terms, likely retained elements of the original Mongolian language, despite the growth of Islam and the growing use of the Turki language, the latter which Haider naturally spoke. According to the Tarikh-i Rashidi, Haider Dughlat considered his "Moghul Ulus" to be a separate people from the settled Turks of Transoxiania, from the fifteenth century and the first half of the sixteenth century. According to Vasily Bartold, there are “some indications that the language of the Moghuls was Mongolian until the 16th century". For the sedentary Mongols in Transoxiana, the nomadic Mongols to their east in Xinjiang and Kashgar represented a bastion of true Mongol culture, hence the name "Moghulistan".

Campaigns
He first campaigned in Kashmir in 1533, on behalf of Sultan Said Khan, of Kashgar. However, he did not stay long in Kashmir, leaving after making a treaty with the local sultan and striking coins in the name of Said Khan. He had also attacked Tibet through Ladakh but failed to conquer Lhasa.

He returned in 1540, fighting for the Mughal Emperor Humayun, first son of Babur, this time for a military takeover at the invitation of one of the two rival factions that continually vied for power in Kashmir. This was shortly after Humayun's 1540 defeat at the Battle of Kanauj, where Dughlat was also on the losing side.  Arriving in Kashmir, Haidar installed as sultan the head of the Sayyid faction, Nazuk. In 1546, after Humayun recovered Kabul, Haidar removed Nazuk Shah and struck coins in the name of the Mughal emperor. He died in 1550 after being killed in battle with the Kashmiris.  He lies buried in the Gorstan e Shahi in Srinagar.

Works
His historical work Tarikh-i-Rashidi (تاریخ رشیدی) ( History of Rashid ) is a personal memoir combined with a Central Asian history written in Persian. Mirza Muhammad Haidar dedicated this extensive work, written in Kashmir in  two volumes, to the contemporary ruler of Kashgaria, viz., Abdurashid Khan, son of Sultan Said Khan. It was translated into English in 1895 by Ney Elias and Edward Denison Ross. Among other events, the Tarikh-i-Rashidi describes the founding of the Kazakh Khanate in 1465 and Muhammad Haidar Dughlat's personal encounter with one of the early Kazakh rulers, namely Kasym Khan.

Family
He belonged to the family of hereditary rulers of Kashgaria – dughlat Amirs. His father was Muhammad Hussain Mirza Kurkan (he was married to Khub Nigar Khanim, daughter of Yunus Khan), son of Muhammad Haidar Mirza Kurkan (he was married to Daulat Nigar Khanim, daughter of Esen Buqa Khan), son of Amir Sayyid Ali Kurkan (he was married to Uzun Sultan Khanim, sister of Vais Khan), son of Amir Sayyid Ahmad, son of Amir Khudaidad, who is said to have raised to khanship six of the Moghul Khans as well as making a pilgrimage to Makkah (Khizr Khoja (1389–1399), Shama-i-Jahan (1399–1408), Muhammad (1408–1416), Nakhsh-i- Jahan (1416–1418), Shir Muhammad (1418–1425), Vais (1418–1428)), son of Amir Pulaji, who raised to the khanship a young, 18- years old, Tughlugh Timur Khan ( first Moghul Khan ), in 1347, having brought him from Ili to Aksu and declared him to have been the grandson of Duwa Khan. Amir Pulaji was a descendant of Dughlat Tarkhan Babdaghan, who was granted the country Mangalai Suyah (Faced to Sun) or Kashgaria by Chagatai Khan, second son of Chengiz Khan, in 1219 or 1220.

His mother was Khub Nigar Khanim, third daughter of Yunus Khan by Isan Daulat Begum, and a younger sister of Kutluk Nigar Khanim, mother of Babur. Mirza Muhammad Haidar governed Kashmir from 1540 to 1551, when he was killed in battle.

Muhammad Haidar Mirza (I) Dughlat was his grandfather.

Films 
In 2007, Kazakhfilm Studio released the documentary Muhammad Haidar Dughlat («Мұхаммед Хайдар Дулати»), directed by Kalila Umarov.

Notes

References
Mansura Haidar (translator) (2002), Mirza Haidar Dughlat as Depicted in Persian Sources

External links
 
Selections from the Tarikh-i-Rashidi
The Tarikh i Rashidi Download Full Book PDF by Murad Butt
TARIKH-I-RASHIDI
The Tarikh-i-rashidi: A History of the Moghuls of Central Asia; an English Version (1895)
The Tarikh-i-rashidi

1551 deaths
Dughlats
Year of birth uncertain
Historians of Central Asia
Mughal Empire
16th-century Turkic people